John French (7 November 1770 – 14 February 1848) was an Anglican priest in Ireland.

French was born in Roscommon educated at Trinity College, Dublin. He was  Dean of Elphin from 1797 until his death.

He married Emily Magenis, third daughter of Richard Magenis of Waringstown.

Notes

Alumni of Trinity College Dublin
1770 births
Deans of Elphin
18th-century Irish Anglican priests
People from County Roscommon
1848 deaths